Jenny Han is an American author of young adult fiction and children's fiction. She is best known for writing the To All the Boys series and The Summer I Turned Pretty trilogy, which were adapted into a film series and TV series, respectively.

Early life and education
Han was born and raised in Richmond, Virginia, to Korean-American parents. She graduated from Governor's School for Government and International Studies in 1998, then attended the University of North Carolina at Chapel Hill. In 2006, she received her Master of Fine Arts in creative writing at The New School.

Career
Han wrote her first book, the children's novel Shug, while she was in college. Shug was published in 2006 and is about Annemarie Wilcox, a twelve-year-old trying to navigate the perils of junior high school.

Her next project was a young adult romance trilogy about a girl's coming-of-age during her summer breaks. The three novels, The Summer I Turned Pretty, It's Not Summer Without You, and We'll Always Have Summer, were published from 2009 to 2011 by Simon & Schuster and quickly became New York Times Best Sellers.  The trilogy is the story of protagonist/narrator, Belly Conklin, who falls in love with two brothers she has known her whole life and works through a messy love triangle.

Han's second young adult trilogy was co-written with Siobhan Vivian and began with the 2012 publication of Burn for Burn. The novel follows three high school girls seeking revenge in their island town and contains paranormal and romance elements. The trilogy includes Fire with Fire, published in 2013, and Ashes to Ashes, published in 2014.

In 2014, Han released a young adult romance novel, To All the Boys I've Loved Before, about Lara Jean Song Covey, a high school student whose life turns upside down when the letters she wrote to her five past crushes are mailed without her knowledge. The novel was optioned for a screen adaptation within weeks of its publication. The sequel, P.S. I Still Love You, was released the following year, and won the Young Adult 2015–2016 Asian/Pacific American Award for Literature. A third novel, Always and Forever, Lara Jean, was released in 2017. The film adaptation of the first novel, starring Lana Condor in the lead role, began filming in July 2017 and was released by Netflix in August 2018, to positive reviews. Han had a brief cameo in the film. The sequel films To All the Boys: P.S. I Still Love You and To All the Boys: Always and Forever were released in 2020 and 2021. A spinoff television series XO, Kitty to To All the Boys film series created by Han is in production. Han will also write, executive produce, and be a showrunner. The series will follow Lara's sister, Kitty Covey, going on her own journey to find true love.

In June 2022, a television series based on Han's book series The Summer I Turned Pretty was released on Amazon Prime. Han had a cameo in the last episode of the series.  The television adaptation was noteworthy in part because there were a number of modifications to make the story more diverse.  For example, in the book, Belly appears to be white, as confirmed by the original book cover. However, in the television series, Belly is biracial; her dad is white and her mom is Korean American. In the book, Belly's mom is Laurel Dunne, but in the television series her name is Laurel Park.  Additionally, in the television adaptation, there are several openly gay characters, and a major character (Jeremiah) is bisexual. The series was renewed for a second season before the first season was even released.

Bibliography
Children's books
 Shug (2006) 
 Clara Lee and the Apple Pie Dream (2011) 

The Summer I Turned Pretty trilogy
 The Summer I Turned Pretty (2009) 
 It's Not Summer Without You  (2010) 
 We'll Always Have Summer (2011) 

Burn for Burn trilogy (co-authored with Sioban Vivian)
 Burn for Burn (2012) 
 Fire with Fire (2013) 
 Ashes to Ashes (2014) 

To All the Boys trilogy 
 To All the Boys I've Loved Before (2014) 
 P.S. I Still Love You (2015)  
 Always and Forever, Lara Jean (2017) 

Short stories
 "Polaris Is Where You'll Find Me" in My True Love Gave To Me: Twelve Holiday Stories (2014)

References

External links

 
 

Living people
21st-century American women writers
21st-century American novelists
American children's writers
American writers of Korean descent
American writers of young adult literature
Writers from Richmond, Virginia
University of North Carolina at Chapel Hill alumni
Novelists from New York (state)
1980 births